Charles Francis Richter (April 26, 1900 – September 30, 1985) was an American seismologist and physicist.

Richter is most famous as the creator of the Richter magnitude scale, which, until the development of the moment magnitude scale in 1979, quantified the size of earthquakes. Inspired by Kiyoo Wadati's 1928 paper on shallow and deep earthquakes, Richter first used the scale in 1935 after developing it in collaboration with Beno Gutenberg; both worked at the California Institute of Technology.

The quote "logarithmic plots are a device of the devil" is attributed to Richter.

Childhood and education
Richter was born in Overpeck, Ohio. Richter had German heritage: his great-grandfather was a Forty-Eighter, coming from Baden-Baden (today in Baden-Württemberg, Germany) in 1848 in the wake of the Revolutions of 1848 in the German states. Richter's parents Frederick William and Lillian Anna (Kinsinger) Richter, were divorced when he was very young. He grew up with his maternal grandfather, who moved the family (including his mother) to Los Angeles in 1909. After graduating from Los Angeles High School he attended Stanford University and received his undergraduate degree in 1920. In 1928, he began work on his PhD in theoretical physics from the California Institute of Technology, but, before he finished it, he was offered a position at the Carnegie Institute of Washington. At this point, he became fascinated with seismology (the study of earthquakes and the waves they produce in the earth). Thereafter, he worked at the new Seismological Laboratory in Pasadena, under the direction of Beno Gutenberg. In 1932, Richter and Gutenberg developed a standard scale to measure the relative sizes of earthquake sources, called the Richter scale. In 1937, he returned to the California Institute of Technology, where he spent the rest of his career, eventually becoming professor of seismology in 1952.

Career
Richter went to work at the Carnegie Institution of Washington in 1927 after Robert Millikan offered him a position as a research assistant there, where he began a collaboration with Beno Gutenberg. The Seismology Lab at the California Institute of Technology wanted to begin publishing regular reports on earthquakes in southern California and had a pressing need for a system of measuring the strength of earthquakes for these reports. Together, Richter and Gutenberg devised the scale that would become known at the Richter scale to fill this need, based on measuring quantitatively the displacement of the earth by seismic waves, as Kiyoo Wadati had suggested.

The pair designed a seismograph that measured this displacement and developed a logarithmic scale to measure intensity. The name "magnitude" for this measurement came from Richter's childhood interest in astronomy - astronomers measure the intensity of stars in magnitudes.  Gutenberg's contribution was substantial, but his aversion to interviews contributed to his name being left off the scale. After the publication of the proposed scale in 1935, seismologists quickly adopted it for use in measuring the intensity of earthquakes.

Richter remained at the Carnegie Institution until 1936, when he obtained a post at the California Institute of Technology, where Beno Gutenberg worked. Gutenberg and Richter published Seismicity of the Earth in 1941.  Its revised edition, published in 1954, is considered a standard reference in the field.

Richter became a full professor at the California Institute of Technology in 1952. In 1958, he published Elementary Seismology based on his undergraduate teaching notes. As Richter seldom published in peer-reviewed scientific journals, that is often considered his most important contribution to seismology.  Richter spent 1959 and 1960 in Japan as a Fulbright scholar.  Around this time in his career, he became involved in earthquake engineering through development of building codes for earthquake prone areas. The city government of Los Angeles removed many ornaments and cornices from municipal buildings in the 1960s as a result of Richter's awareness campaigns.

After the 1971 San Fernando earthquake, the city cited Richter's warnings as important in preventing many deaths. Richter had retired in 1970.

Richter magnitude scale
At the time when Richter began a collaboration with Gutenberg, the only way to rate shocks was a scale developed in 1902 by the Italian priest and geologist Giuseppe Mercalli. The Mercalli scale uses Roman numerals and classifies earthquakes from I to XII, depending on how buildings and people responded to the tremor. A shock that set chandeliers swinging might rate as a I or II on this scale, while one that destroyed huge buildings and created panic in a crowded city might count as an X. The obvious problem with the Mercalli scale was that it relied on subjective measures of how well a building had been constructed and how used to these sorts of crises the population was. The Mercalli scale also made it difficult to rate earthquakes that happened in remote, sparsely populated areas.

The scale developed by Richter and Gutenberg (which became known by Richter's name only) was instead an absolute measure of an earthquake's intensity. Richter used a seismograph, an instrument generally consisting of a constantly unwinding roll of paper, anchored to a fixed place, and a pendulum or magnet suspended with a marking device above the roll, to record actual earth motion during an earthquake. The scale takes into account the instrument's distance from the epicenter, or the point on the ground that is directly above the earthquake's origin.

Richter chose to use the term "magnitude" to describe an earthquake's strength because of his early interest in astronomy; stargazers use the word to describe the brightness of stars. Gutenberg suggested that the scale be logarithmic so  an earthquake of magnitude 7 would be ten times stronger than a 6, a hundred times stronger than a 5, and a thousand times stronger than a 4. (The 1989 Loma Prieta earthquake that shook San Francisco was magnitude 6.9.)

The Richter scale was published in 1935 and immediately became the standard measure of earthquake intensity. Richter did not seem concerned that Gutenberg's name was not included at first; but in later years, after Gutenberg was already dead, Richter began to insist for his colleague to be recognized for expanding the scale to apply to earthquakes all over the globe, not just in southern California. Since 1935, several other magnitude scales have been developed.

Personal life
Richter was an active and avowed naturist. He travelled to many nudist communities with his wife who died in 1972.

 states Richter was an atheist, but she also quotes a Robert Kaufman letter to the New York Times which stated that Richter was a member of Kaufman's congregation.

At his retirement party, a group of Caltech colleagues called the "Quidnuncs" played and sang a ditty titled "Richter Scale", which told in ballad style of earthquakes in American history. Richter was initially shy about the song, thinking it demeaned science.  However, the author of the song, Kent Clark, stated in a 1989 interview that eventually Richter enjoyed the song.

Richter died of congestive heart failure on September 30, 1985, in Pasadena, California. He is buried in Altadena, California's Mountain View Cemetery and Mausoleum.

Works

See also

Modified Mercalli intensity scale
Seismicity
Macroseismic magnitude

Notes and references

External links
Charles Richter interview, at USGS
Charles Richter Quotations
Charles F. Richter Papers, Caltech Archives

1900 births
1985 deaths
American atheists
American naturists
American people of German descent
American seismologists
California Institute of Technology alumni
California Institute of Technology faculty
People from Butler County, Ohio
Stanford University alumni